In Greek mythology, Crantor (Ancient Greek: Κράντωρ, -ορος) was a son of Amyntor and possibly Hippodamia or Cleobule. He was probably the brother of Astydameia and Phoenix.

Mythology 
When Amyntor lost a war with Achilles' father Peleus, Amyntor gave his son Crantor to Peleus as a pledge of peace. Crantor became the arms-bearer for Peleus, and was killed by the centaur Demoleon in the Centauromachy, the battle between the Lapiths and the Centaurs at the wedding feast of Pirithous. Demoleon fatally wounded Crantor after he tore off Crantor's chest and left shoulder with a tree trunk that Demoleon had thrown at Theseus, who ducked out of the way. When Peleus saw this he cried out: "O Crantor! most beloved! / Dearest of young men!’, and then succeeded in killing Demoleon.

Note

References
 Apollodorus, The Library with an English Translation by Sir James George Frazer, F.B.A., F.R.S. in 2 Volumes, Cambridge, MA, Harvard University Press; London, William Heinemann Ltd. 1921. ISBN 0-674-99135-4. Online version at the Perseus Digital Library. Greek text available from the same website.
Publius Ovidius Naso, Metamorphoses translated by Brookes More (1859-1942). Boston, Cornhill Publishing Co. 1922. Online version at the Perseus Digital Library.
Publius Ovidius Naso, Metamorphoses. Hugo Magnus. Gotha (Germany). Friedr. Andr. Perthes. 1892. Latin text available at the Perseus Digital Library.

Characters in Greek mythology
Thessalian mythology